Algia felderi is a butterfly of the family Nymphalidae. It is found on New Guinea.

Subspecies
Algia felderi felderi (Kirsch, 1877) (northern West Irian to New Guinea)
Algia felderi mimicus (Rothschild, 1904) (Papua New Guinea)

References

Vagrantini
Butterflies described in 1877